Of the fourteen teams that would participate in the 2013 Rugby League World Cup, only two were not automatic inclusions, so must win qualifying matches to enter the tournament, which was held in Wales and England. Originally around twenty teams were to be involved in qualification for the tournament, but this was eventually fixed at nineteen.

Qualified teams

Pacific
Seven teams from the Pacific qualified for the World Cup. All of these teams were granted automatic qualification.
 (automatic qualifier)
 (automatic qualifier)
 (automatic qualifier)
 (automatic qualifier)
 (automatic qualifier)
 (automatic qualifier)
 (automatic qualifier)

Europe
Six teams from Europe qualified; five teams automatically, with the sixth going to Italy, the winner of the European qualifying group.
 (automatic qualifier and co-host)
 (automatic qualifier and co-host)
 (automatic qualifier)
 (automatic qualifier)
 (automatic qualifier)
 (Winner of the European qualifying group)

Atlantic
One team from the Atlantic region qualified for the World Cup.
 (Winner of the Atlantic qualifying group)

Continental qualifying

Atlantic

The Atlantic qualifying group involved the USA, Jamaica and South Africa.  The Atlantic qualifiers were held at Campbell's Field, New Jersey. USA won the group and qualified for the World Cup.

Europe

The European qualifying group involved Russia, Italy, Serbia and Lebanon. Both Italy and Lebanon remained unbeaten, recording two wins and a draw each. However, Italy topped the group as a result of points difference and therefore qualified for the World Cup.

See also
 Rugby League World Cup
 2013 Rugby League World Cup

References

External links

Qualifying, 2013 Rugby League World Cup
2011 in rugby league
2011 in American sports
2011 in Jamaican sport
2011 in South African sport
2011 in Lebanese sport
2011 in Italian sport
2011 in Russian sport
2011 in Serbian sport